Dawda Jallow (born 22 December 1966) is a Gambian sprinter. He competed in the 400 metres at the 1984, 1988 and the 1996 Summer Olympics.

References

1966 births
Living people
Athletes (track and field) at the 1984 Summer Olympics
Athletes (track and field) at the 1988 Summer Olympics
Athletes (track and field) at the 1992 Summer Olympics
Athletes (track and field) at the 1996 Summer Olympics
Gambian male sprinters
Olympic athletes of the Gambia
Place of birth missing (living people)